Tralli-Valli is the third studio album by Ukrainian singer Verka Serduchka released in 2006 by Mamamusic.

Overview
The new album marks the collaboration between Andrey Danilko ang songwriter Tatyana Zaluzhnya, better known as Lyubasha. She is the author of the music and lyrics of most of the songs on the album. Two songs on the album were written by Arkady Gartsman. Danilko Danilko remained in the role of producer and arranger. According to the artist, the album turned out to be of high quality and too good for Serduchka. Humor skits were recorded for the album, and the final track list included two of them. The album was recorded in 2005–2006 at Mamamusic Studio in Kyiv.

For the first time, a new song from the album "Sama sebe" was played on radio stations in October 2005. A live performance of the song took place at the Lyubasha's benefit concert in the Kremlin on 15 November 2005, the song "Lyubi menya" also was performed.

Some songd from the album were included in the soundtrack of the musical "The adventures of Verka Serdyuchka", which was shown on New Year's Eve on 31 December 2005 on the Ukrainian TV channel Inter. In Russia Channel One refused to broadcast the musical. The film features the songs "Khorosho krasavitsam", "Kiyevsky vokzal", "Lyubi menya", "Plakat ili radovatsya", "A ya smeyus" and "Trali-Vali".

The album was released in August 2006. There were three versions of the cover's color scheme: blue, pink, and light green.

Track listing

Personnel
Musicians

 Andrey Danilko – lead vocals (all tracks), songwriting (1, 8, 9, 11, 13), production (all tracks)
 Lyubasha – songwriting (2-7, 10, 12)
 Arkady Gartsman – songwriting (9, 10)
 "Theater Danilko" – background vocals (3)
 Natalia Gura – background vocals (2-4, 12)
 Gennady Krupnik – background vocals (2-4, 12)
 Sasha Belkina – background vocals (4, 5, 12)
 Vasily Goldakovsky – background vocals (5)
 Sergey Dobrovolsky – guitar (3)
 Sergey Rybalkin – guitar (5, 10)
 Anatoly Plotnikov – bass guitar (5, 6, 9, 10)
 Andrey Kuzmenchuk – drums (5-7, 9-11), percussions (5)
 Alexander Rukomoynikov – saxophone (5, 9, 10)
 Sergey Khomenko – trumpet (5, 10)
 Anton Buryko – trumpet (5, 9, 10)
 Sergey Sulima – trombone (5, 10)
 Konstantin Strelchenko – bayan (5-7, 10)
 Sergey Trotsenko – bayan (9)
 Vyacheslav Filonov – violin (5, 10)
 Yevgeny Mezentsev – balalaika (5, 6)
 Maxim Gladetsky – double bass (11)

 Technical
 Alexey Khvatsky – arrangement (2-7, 9-12)
 Vladimir Bebeshko – production of background vocals
 Sergey Dobrovolsky – recording, mixing, mastering (2-7, 9-12)
 Ilya Klimov – recording, mixing (skits)

Studios
 Mamamusic Studio (2005-2006, Kyiv) – recording, mixing (all tracks)

Management and marketing
 Yury Nikitin – management, executive production
 Igor Klinkov – personal management
 Dmitry Peretrutov – photography
 Yelena Araslanova – design

Charts

References

2006 albums
Verka Serduchka albums
Mamamusic albums
Russian-language albums